Picket Lake is an unorganized territory located in Saint Louis County, Minnesota, United States. As of the 2000 census, its population was zero.

Geography
The United States Forest Service describes Picket Lake as an area comprising 383 lake acres and 4097 acres of National Forest land.

The closest town to the lake is Orr. The Forest Service provides three backcountry campsites around the lake, and the parking lot is accessible via Forest Road 477.

References

Populated places in St. Louis County, Minnesota
Unorganized territories in Minnesota